Chris Pedersen may refer to:

Chris Pedersen (actor), American actor
Chris Pedersen (musician), drummer